Larry Scott (born January 2, 1977) is an American football coach. He is the head football coach at Howard University, a position he has held since the 2020 season.

Scott played college football at the University of South Florida. He returned to South Florida in 2006 as a coach. He joined Miami as the tight end coach in 2013. He became the interim head coach on October 25, 2015 after Al Golden was fired.

After Mark Richt was hired as the Hurricanes head coach, Scott was hired by head coach Butch Jones to serve as tight ends coach for the Tennessee Volunteers in 2016. Scott was promoted to offensive coordinator after the 2016 season. After the firing of Butch Jones, Scott was not retained by new head coach Jeremy Pruitt. On January 25, 2018, Scott was hired by the Florida Gators to coach tight ends under new coach Dan Mullen. Scott replaces Ja'Juan Seider who left to coach running backs at Penn State.

Head coaching record

References

External links
 Howard profile

1977 births
Living people
American football offensive tackles
Florida Gators football coaches
Miami Hurricanes football coaches
South Florida Bulls football coaches
South Florida Bulls football players
Tennessee Volunteers football coaches
High school football coaches in Florida
People from Sebring, Florida
Coaches of American football from Florida
Players of American football from Florida
African-American coaches of American football
African-American players of American football
20th-century African-American sportspeople
21st-century African-American sportspeople